Robert Gull (born 12 January 1991) is a Swedish motorcycle racer. He won the 125cc Swedish Championship in 2007 and 2008 and he has also competed in the 2007 Red Bull MotoGP Rookies Cup season and in a 2008 125cc World Championship race. Gull held the Guinness World Record for the fastest motorcycle wheelie on ice from 16 March 2014 to 31 January 2015 and achieved it again on 28 February 2015.

Career statistics

Grand Prix motorcycle racing

By season

Races by year
(key)

References

External links
 Profile on MotoGP.com

1991 births
Living people
Swedish motorcycle racers
125cc World Championship riders
Sportspeople from Stockholm